Uniwide Sales, Inc. was a retail operator in Metro Manila, Philippines. It was incorporated in January 1975 by Chinese Filipino entrepreneur Jimmy Gow to operate Uniwide commercial shopping centers such as the lease of commercial spaces within the compound of their malls and department stores.

Uniwide had about 2,000 employees. The competing retailers of the 1970s and the 1980s were: COD Department Store, Ever Gotesco Malls, Plaza Fair, Isetann and The Landmark but lagged behind SM Supermalls, Robinsons Malls and Ayala Malls. It had two branches and was set to be close down by the order of Securities and Exchange Commission.

History
The roots of Uniwide date back to January 1975 when it established in Avenida Rizal as Uniwide Sales Textile Bargain House Center. With the success, the Gow family expanded to ready-to-wear apparel, accessories and then became a complete department store and supermarket chain.

The company introduced the mass-oriented warehouse club concept in the country in 1988, establishing a chain of warehouse clubs in prime locations in the country in the next two years, which also started the company's woes. Some of its assets in prime location such as its abandoned building in Cubao, Quezon City (was destroyed by fire in 1996) were already bought by Puregold Price Club Inc. of the Co family. Another unfinished building in Mandaue City, Cebu at that time was supposedly as a warehouse club, which was occupied by slum dwellers and today, the site was subsequently occupied and converted into a shopping centre named Parkmall. The warehouse in Marcos Highway was already demolished and the lot sold to Gokongwei-led Robinsons Land Corporation's commercial centers division to pave the way for Robinsons Metro East and in Libis, Quezon City to pave way for Wilcon Depot. Its remaining warehouse club is in Metromall in Las Piñas, Tarlac City, Malolos in Bulacan, Caloocan, Novaliches in Quezon City and Sucat in Parañaque (these said branches were later became Super 8 Grocery Warehouse in 2006, when these warehouse clubs were sold its stake). From 1992 to 1999, in partnership with RPN-9, they have a quiz show called Battle of the Brains.

In 1998, it entered into corporate rehabilitation during the Asian financial crisis. At that time, the company's retail business had a network of eight warehouse clubs and two department stores. Liquidity problems, however, affected earnings. Sales declined from its peak of P14.5 billion in 1997 to just about P4.3 billion in 2000.

Many times, they attempted to clear Baguio City Market in Baguio, Benguet to build a mall, but due to the opposition from the vendors, stall owners and associations kept the project on hold and opposition still was around.

The Uniwide Coastal Mall was envisioned in the 1990s to become the country's biggest shopping mall complex. It was built on a 10-hectare portion of MBDC's 40-hectare Central Business Park II in Parañaque City at a time when Cabangis and Rey were UHI's respective chief financial officer and controller. The mall was 90% complete and was partially operational with tenants already occupying the finished parts of the mall fronting Roxas Boulevard prior to the 1997 Asian financial crisis. The mall never formally opened as a result, and only contained few operational establishments, including GALA Bowling Club, Shakey's Pizza, Prodatanet, Jollibee, B.I.R. Parañaque, Wide Aero Av School, Uniwide Theatre and Movie Hall, McDonald's, Mang Inasal, Hyundai Showroom, Super8 Grocery Warehouse and Dunkin' Donuts. The building was then converted to a transport terminal for public utility vehicles from Batangas and Cavite. By 2006, Coastal Mall was superseded by SM Mall of Asia as the country's biggest shopping mall complex in full operation, and with the construction and opening of Parañaque Integrated Terminal Exchange in 2018 as the new transport terminal hub, Coastal Mall as a whole ceased all functions and was totally abandoned. By April 2022, the main structure was fully demolished, with the approval of the Philippine Reclamation Authority obtained by the Manila Bay Development Corporation (MBDC).

Uniwide's former in-house supermarket chain, Super8 Grocery Warehouse, spun-off from its parent company in 2006 to become Super8 Retail Systems, Inc., a wholly independent company with more than 70 branches across Luzon.

Uniwide Metromall Las Piñas is planning to be redeveloped from SM Prime as SM Metromall Las Piñas.

References

Department stores of the Philippines
Real estate companies established in 1975
Retail companies established in 1975
1975 establishments in the Philippines
Shopping malls established in 1975
Retail companies disestablished in 2013
Shopping malls disestablished in 2013
Companies based in Parañaque
2013 disestablishments in the Philippines
Philippine companies established in 1975